Parascientific Escape is a series of visual novel adventure games developed by Intense and released for the Nintendo 3DS via the Nintendo eShop. It was published by Intense in Japan and CIRCLE Entertainment in North America and Europe. The trilogy follows the interconnecting narrative of the characters Hitomi Akeneno and Kyosuke Ayana, who both have psychic abilities.

Titles 
 Parascientific Escape: Cruise in the Distant Seas is the first game in the series, developed by Intense. It was released for the Nintendo 3DS on July 9, 2014, in Japan, and on March 3, 2016, in North America and Europe.
 Parascientific Escape - Gear Detective is the second entry in the series. It was released on the Nintendo 3DS on December 2, 2015, in Japan, February 9, 2017 in North America, and March 2, 2017, in Europe.
 Parascientific Escape - Crossing at the Farthest Horizon is the third game in the series. It was released for the Nintendo 3DS on February 22, 2017, in Japan, July 27, 2017, in North America, and August 31, 2017, in Europe.

Synopsis

Cruise in the Distant Seas 
Hitomi Akeneno, a psychic high school student with the power of clairvoyance and telekenesis, is invited to the maiden voyage of a cruise ship via an anonymous invitation from a sender who claims to know her father and sister. When she arrives at the suite designated in the letter, an explosion rocks the ship. She ends up stumbling upon Merja Amabishi in the suite, the daughter of Amabishi's CEO. Merja has a device strapped to her neck, and shows Hitomi a letter she received, stating that the device is a bomb that will explode in only a few hours, unless it can be activated via three hidden keycards. The letter is signed by the "Ghost of W", and warns Merja cannot seek help from more than three people, and cannot contact any officials. Hitomi and her best friend, Chisono Shio; a psychic with telepathic abilities, take it upon themselves to utilize their abilities to save Merja, and discover the bomber identity, while also trying to escape the sinking ship.

The trio happen upon Misaki, a famous singer. Misaki agrees to aide the trio with their crisis. During the search for the keycards, Misaki tells Hitomi about her late boyfriend Wataru who died while searching as a doctor in a civil conflict in the country of Witsarock. After all three keycards are uncovered and are placed into the device to unlock Merja's bomb, Chisono notices that the writing on the cards spells out "M-I-S-A-K-I". Misaki confesses that she put the bomb on Merja's neck, and that she is an accomplice to the mastermind. Misaki holds a deep grudge against Amabishi for their real in the Witsarock conflict which killed Wataru. She intended to kill Merja by detonating the bomb within just a few minutes, but she realized that she was simply being used by the mastermind when Merja's bomb failed to go off at the intended time. This caused her to realize the awful mistake she was making, and so joined the effort to save Merja of her own accord to recompense.

The group come head-to-head "The Ghost", who is dressed in the likeness of Amabishi's mascot, Mimimi. It is revealed that The Ghost is a female, that she is a double psychic with electrokinesis and teleportation abilities, which she utilised in the execution of her plans. The Ghost tells the group that she orchestrated the entire "game" for Hitomi's sake, as a "tutorial". She also tells Hitomi that she wasn't lying about knowing her sister.  The group find a way to open a route to the ship's deck make a desperate dash towards freedom. Hitomi strains herself to the limit on her telekinesis to keep the Ghost from shutting the final doors, allowing them all to get through. On the deck of the sinking ship the group wave down a helicopter in the distance.

A post-credit scene reveals that the events of the "miraculous escape" has since become worldwide news. Consequently, Hitomi's status as a double psychic is now public and she has become a household name. Hitomi and Chisono decide to join the psychic research organization ZENA.

Gear Detective 
As part of an experiment with the organisation IXG, Kyosuke Ayana, who had lost his arm and eye, agreed to be given a technologically advance prosthetic arm and a fake eye which are able to artificially replicate the rare psychic ability, chronokinesis. In the present, Kyosuke Ayana Runs a detective agency alongside his self-proclaimed "lover", Mari Sasamine. A young woman called Tsukiko Nagise arrives at the agency one day, claiming that she is being targeted by a serial killer. Investigations into the case reveal that the culprit may be a physic who is utilizing chronokinesis to forge seemingly impossible murders by altering the past. Kyosuke ultimately discovers that Tsukiko herself is the serial killer, and that the incident is connected to the death of his father, Gento Ayana.

Kyosuke learns that Gento used to a researcher at an undisclosed PSI research laboratory within the country Witsarock. The laboratory kept psychic children as test subjects who were subjected to inhuman living conditions and experiments. Tsukiko used to be a test subject at this laboratory, where she befriended and grew extremely close to a fellow test subjected called Ritsu, a powerful psychic. Ritsu and Tsukiko escaped the facility which Ritsu destroyed in the process. Ritsu now wants to try and forge a world for psychics, and Tsukiko has since been working to eliminate those who stand her way, although she has been doing so independently from Ritsu. Kyosuke also discovers that his artificial arm and eye from which he gets his chronokinesis ability was created using this experiment data, that was brought by IXG.

After having her plans to kill the CEO of Amabishi is foiled by Kyosuke and Mari (with the help of Hitomi Akaneno in a cameo appearance) Tsukiko is told by Ritsu to stop doing what she has been doing. Distraught at being tossed aside, and seemingly without a purpose, Tsukiko flees to the basement where she plans to kill herself by utilising an explosion. Kyosukes chases her down, and has a one-on-one with her.

Endings 
 Normal ending: Kyosuke is successful at getting through to Tsukiko and the pair escape the building unharmed. Tsukiko is determined to become her own person, and atone for her crimes, while remaining Mari and Kyosuke's friend. She awaits trial, and refuses all offers and plea bargains to minimise her punishment. As per a promise made between the pair during the course of the game, Yosuke and Mari are now engaged to be married. The ending concludes with the pair walking happily hand in hand.
 Bad ending: Tsukiko is not convinced by Kyosuke, and she ends up killing herself with the explosion. A distressed Mari stops acting as Kyosuke's assistant, and Kyosuke reflects on what went wrong. The ending concludes with Kyosuke not knowing if he will be able to continue on as a detective after what has transpired.
 Special ending: Starts off the same as the normal ending. However Tsukiko is released on parole via a special deal. Consequently, she begins working at Kyosuke's office as his second assistant. Tsukiko and Mari also agree to "share" Kyosuke's romantic affections between just the two of them. The ending concludes with Kyosuke reflecting on how strangely okay he is with the situation as he watches his two new girlfriends having fun with each other.

Crossing at the Farthest Horizon 
Following the events of Cruise in the Distant Seas, Hitomi Akeneno has begun working at ZENA, a psychic research facility. Since the incident on the cruise ship she has been hunting "The Ghost"; a mysterious villain of unknown identity who seems to have a personal connection to her. After receiving a letter from someone claiming to be The Ghost, she travels to the country of Witsarock. Meanwhile, the newly engaged Kyosuke Ayana and Mari Sasamine are also lead to Witsarock in their hunt the psychic Ritsu Kamiji, a powerful psychic connected to the Camellia Hills serial killing case.

Gameplay 
The games are visual novel adventure games, in which the player controls a psychic. In all three games players progress through conversations with characters, as well as use a menu to navigate their way around environments to gather information and progress the story. When the character needs to escape a locked room, the gameplay shifts into escape the room sections. While the first game doesn't define these segments, the sequel defines these into two distinct segments for the conversations with characters, and escape the room gameplay, called "Adventure" and "Investigation" sections, respectively. The third game further defines the segments, by making moments involving the player navigating environments to progress the story its own section called "map", wheres the escape the room segments are called "search".

Adventure gameplay

During "adventure" sections, the player engages in conversations with other characters. In the first game, this took the form of linear story progression, and the player being prompted with several topics to discuss. However the sequels replace this with the player being prompted to pick a response on occasion. "Map" sections involve the player visiting locations by using various menu commands to move between locations, and interact with people, and things in the current environment via determined prompts. The purpose of these sections is to find the right actions to progress towards a linear conclusion.

Search gameplay

During "search" sections, the player is tasked with finding a way past a lock of some sort, ordinarily to escape a location. To do this, they interact with the environment directly by touching various things. Interacting with objects prompts a list of available commands, such as "look", to examine the object in question, or "press", to press a switch. The player can pick up objects, which puts them into the inventory in the menu. Selecting the item, then interacting with something it can be used on, results in a new prompt to appear to use the item in question. The first game includes the "hint" option that allows the player to get a hint from the characters for one of the puzzles. The sequels replaced this with the option to make the protagonist "think", where it serves the same purpose.

Psychic abilities
To solve the various puzzles during search gameplay, the player must use the protagonist's psychic abilities. In Cruise in the Distant Sea, Hitomi Akeneno's clairvoyance and telekinesis take the form of sections where the player must use clairvoyance to look behind a limited area of a surface. Then they use telekinesis to manipulate the area behind the surface to open a lock, or bring something out to a reachable place. This takes the form of a puzzle where they must navigate objects through maze to particular locations, or simply manipulate the environment in the right way. They have a limited amount of "telekinesis points" and "clairvoyance points" to do this. In Gear Detective and Crossing at the Farthest Horizon, the player has access to Kyosuke Ayana's chronokenisis at most times during search sections. Using this, they can look into, and interact with, the past of the current environment for up to 5 days back, by selecting the number of days back, and the time (e.g. "3 days back - 14:30"). Using a timeline of the past, they can manipulate the environment of the past to alter past events or the past environment. This causes changes to the present and progresses the puzzles.

Endings and bonus modes
With the exception of Cruise in the Distant Seas, the games have multiple endings, as well as a new game plus mode. The ending the player achieves is determined by stars earned at the end of each chapter: a gold star, pink star, or no star. The majority, or a lack of a majority, determines the ending, either good for gold, bad for none or no majority, or special for pink. The new game plus mode unlocks more options for responses upon a second playthrough, allowing more chances for gold and pink stars, which are required in both the second and third game in order to gain the special ending. During new game plus the player is also able to return to any chapter at any time, and are given the option to skip individual "adventure", "map", and "search" sections.

Plot and setting

Recurring elements and characters 
The series takes place in an alternative world where paranormal abilities are known to exist in people born as psychics, and are studied regularly in the field of parascience. The first game follows the protagonist Hitomi Akeneno, a high school student who hides her status as the "world's first double psychic" that can use both clairvoyance and telekinesis. The protagonist of the second game is the private detective Kyosuke Ayana, who despite not having been born with psychic powers can artificially use chronokenisis via his prosthetic arm and eye. The third game features both Hitomi and Kyosuke as protagonists, with Kyosuke being the only character playable during the search segments.

Hitomi is accompanied through the first game by her friend, Chisono Shio, who is a telepathy psychic. Other characters include Merja Amabishi, the daughter of Amabishi's CEO and Misaki Himekiri, a famous singer. Kyosuke is aided in the second game by Mari Sasamine, his assistant who wants him to be her husband, along with Yukiya Ousaka, Kyosuke's close friend and a secretary of IXG. In the third game, key returning characters include: Ritsu Kamiji, the "strongest physic" who is also Hitomi's sister, and Tsukiko Nagise, the culprit of the serial murder in Camellia Hills who is on probation via a special plea bargain.

A major plot element in the series is the Amabishi congratulate, and its co-operative relationships with ZENA, a psychic research organization who receives their funding from Amabishi, and IXG, who is Amabishi's main rival in weapon manufacturing. The fictional former Soviet Union country of Witsarock and its heated relations with its Armagrad region also plays a major role. Armagrad recently gained its independence from Witsarock following a civil war, although they are still trying to be recognized as an official sovereign state. Another overarching theme is the relationship between psychics and ordinary humans, the former of which is a vast minority, thus regularly face prejudice, as well as the risk of having to undergo experimentation.

Reception 
Cruise in the Distant Seas received mixed reviews upon its release. Ryan Craddock of Nintendo Life gave the game an 8 out of 10, stating that the game had an "enjoyable story", as well as praising the visuals and the "every enjoyable" gameplay system. However he felt as though the lengthy dialogue sections could feel "quite draining", especially given the lack of an option to save the game during these sections. 

Gear Detective was generally well received, and considered a better follow-up to its predecessor. FNintendo praised its well written story, as well as its interesting puzzles, while being critical of the low production value of its audio visuals. They however stated that the gameplay and overall story was solid enough for it to deserve attention, especially for its low price tag, giving it 7 out of 10. Jason Nason of Darkain Arts Gamers stated that the characters were well fleshed out, and also praised the game's script, and stated that while there were a few "translations hiccups", it was limited and the translators did a "solid job". He was also positive towards the music, which he stated was "pleasing to listen to", and overall considered the game a solid pick for its low price.

Notes

References 

Video game franchises
Visual novels
Video games about psychic powers
Video games developed in Japan
Video games featuring female protagonists
Detective video games
Nintendo 3DS games
Nintendo 3DS eShop games
Nintendo 3DS-only games
Polyamory in fiction